Lajos Bencze (14 October 1918 – 28 July 1994) was a Hungarian wrestler. He competed at the 1948 Summer Olympics and the 1952 Summer Olympics.

References

External links
 

1918 births
1994 deaths
Hungarian male sport wrestlers
Olympic wrestlers of Hungary
Wrestlers at the 1948 Summer Olympics
Wrestlers at the 1952 Summer Olympics
Martial artists from Budapest